Metalmark may refer to:

 Riodinidae, the family of metalmark butterflies (formerly included in the Lycaenidae or "Erycinidae" as subfamily Riodininae)
 Apodemia, the Riodinidae genus most commonly known as the metalmarks in North America
 Choreutidae, the family of moths known as the metalmark moths
 Metalmark Capital, a private equity firm

Animal common name disambiguation pages